Bonanza is the sixth studio album by Mexican rock band Panda, released on 16 March 2012, through Movic and EMI Records. The album's name is an irony towards its songs' melancholy lyrics and frontman Jose Madero's desire to wrote them in a dramatic sense.

It was certified gold after selling over 30,000 copies in Mexico. The album turned to a "garage band" sound, following a leaning to their original pop punk sound they kickstarted in their first two albums, Arroz Con Leche and La Revancha Del Príncipe Charro, while maintaining an alternative rock presence on the entire record.

Reception

Commercial performance 
Bonanza debuted atop the Mexican Albums Chart, becoming the group's fifth album to reach that position, after Para Ti Con Desprecio (2005), Amantes Sunt Amentes (2006), Sinfonía Soledad (2007) and Poetics (2009). Several weeks after its debut on the chart, the album was certified Gold. On the United States, the album debuted at No. 43 on the Billboard Top Latin Albums chart, becoming their highest entry. On the Latin Pop Albums component chart, it reached No. 12, becoming their second highest-charting album on that list after Panda: MTV Unplugged (2010), which reached No. 10.

Track listing

Personnel
Adapted from album liner notes:

Panda 
 Jose Madero – vocals, guitar
 Ricardo Treviño – bass, choirs
 Jorge Vázquez – drums, choirs
 Arturo Arredondo – guitar, choirs

Production / Session musicians 

 Panda – production
 Marcelo Treviño – production, choirs / keyboards (tracks 7 and 8)
 Rodrigo Montfort – recording at DMY Studios in October 2011, choirs / keyboards (track 9)
 Gil Elguezabal – mixing at DMY Studios in December 2011
 Jaime Cavazos – mastering at OVU Mastering Studio
 Jorge Caballero – recording assistant
 Federico Caballero – recording assistant
 Ruly Tamez – drum tech
 Mario Videgaray  – art direction, design
 Jacobo Parra  – photography

Charts

Certifications

Release history

References 

2012 albums
Panda (band) albums
EMI Latin albums